Maranjab's snake skink (Ophiomorus maranjabensis) is a species of skink, a lizard in the family Scincidae. It can be found in north-east of Kashan, Dasht-e Kavir, Iran. From snout to vent 95 mm, tail 81 mm.

References

Ophiomorus
Endemic fauna of Iran
Reptiles of Iran
Reptiles described in 2011